Félix Tanco y Bosmeniel (Jan 28, 1797–1871,  was a writer, poet, and novelist, better known for the first fictional story about slavery in the Americas: Petrona y Rosalía.

Born Félix Manuel de Jesús Tanco y Bosmeniel, in  Bogotá, Colombia, he arrived in Cuba at a very young age.

He was considered  the most radical writer of the epoch speaking against the injustices committed by the colonial government. He wrote at length against slavery and the despotic treatment that many blacks suffered under its authoritarian rule.

In the narrative of his masterpiece Petrona y Rosalía, he spoke about the cruelty inflicted onto the slaves by the ruling master class that was backed by the colonial government. He spoke against the white elitism that predominated in society, which was always protected by a group with special interests in the promulgation and the expansion of the slave trade.

In 1834, while speaking up against the social inequities, Tanco was charged in the judicial court by Governor Miguel Tacón for writing an article about slavery. The article had been published in the literary magazine Aurora de Matanzas that same year. In the article, Tanco respectfully urged the Governor to eradicate, among other things, gambling, bribes, and the slave trade. The governor thought that the article was an insult to his authoritative rank, so he charged him with  insubordination against the government.

Bibliography

Literary criticism of Félix Tanco's publications

References

1797 births
1871 deaths
Cuban male poets